Route 760, or Highway 760, may refer to:

Canada
Alberta Highway 760
 New Brunswick Route 760

Costa Rica
 National Route 760

Netherlands
 Provincial road N760 (Netherlands)

United Kingdom
 A760 road

United States
 
 
 
 
 
 
 
 
Territories
  Puerto Rico Highway 760